Seal culling in Namibia is a contentious issue, with animal rights groups opposing the practice as brutal, but the government supporting it and claiming the seal population may damage the fishing industry which is strategic to the Namibian economy. Seal harvesting in Namibia targets 86,000 seal pups and 6,000 adult bulls. This seal harvest takes place in three places namely, Cape Cross, Wolf Bay and Atlas Bay.

Economic factors
Seals feed upon fish, and some allege that harvesting of seals is necessary lest the fish species be wiped out.

According to the Fisheries Ministry seal harvesting has attracted direct foreign investment, such as the Hatem Yavuz Group who specializes in seal skins export and skins processing. International scientists have also pointed at possible implants from seal tissue while seal heart valves for human heart surgery show promise.

From 2005 to 2015, Namibia has exported nearly 400,000 seal skins. Along with Canada and Greenland, Namibia is one of the last places where seals are hunted for commercial purposes. The country has set an annual hunt quota of 80,000 Cape fur seal pups and 6,000 bulls.

Criticism
Namibia is the only country in the Southern hemisphere where seal harvesting is still practiced, and has attracted criticism from animal rights groups. The legality of seal harvesting is put to question. Rules and regulations governing seal harvesting are not adhered to and currently the office of the Ombudsman in Namibia is carrying out investigations to that effect.

Critics also note that the profits from seal hunting are small compared to those of other Namibian industries, with seal watching bringing in more than seal harvesting does.

See also 

 Namibian Maritime and Fisheries Institute

References

Campbell, R, Knowles, T., O’Connor, S., 2011. The economics of seal hunting and seal watching in Namibia.
Kunneke, R. et al. Sea Shepherds from South Africa and Operation Desert Seal.

Animal rights
Cruelty to animals
Animal culling
Economy of Namibia
History of Namibia
Namibia